The Villa Schutzenberger, also known as Hôtel Schutzenberger is an Art Nouveau hôtel particulier on allée de la Robertsau in the Neustadt district of Strasbourg, in the French department of the Bas-Rhin. It has been classified as a Monument historique since 1975. The Villa is the seat of the European Audiovisual Observatory since 1992.

History
This ample villa was built for the owner of the Schutzenberger brewery , Louis-Oscar Schützenberger (1866–1943), by Jules Berninger and his brother in law, Gustave Krafft, two prolific local architects who often worked together between 1895 and 1905.

Work on the villa started in 1897 and it was finished in 1900. Inspired by Italianate architecture in its shape and the design of its garden, it is one of the most lavish and frequently cited examples of Art Nouveau architecture in Strasbourg. In spite of this, due to the financial decline of the Schutzenberger brewery, the villa was sold and threatened with demolition in 1972. It was ultimately saved by the municipality but stood empty until 1978. The ground floor was then rented by the Parliamentary Assembly of the Council of Europe, which became renter of the whole building in 1989. The Villa Schutzenberger has been completely restored since. It is not open for tourists apart on special days such as European Heritage Days.

Gallery

References

External links

Villa Schutzenberger – 76 Allée de la Robertsau on archi-wiki.org

Literature
Recht, Roland; Foessel, Georges; Klein, Jean-Pierre: Connaître Strasbourg, 1988, page 271

See also
56, Allée de la Robertsau
Hôtel Brion

Art Nouveau houses
Art Nouveau architecture in Strasbourg
Buildings and structures completed in 1900
Monuments historiques of Strasbourg
19th-century architecture in France
20th-century architecture in France
Hôtels particuliers in Strasbourg
Villas in France